Millak Station is a station on the Busan Metro Line 2 in Suyeong-dong, Suyeong District, Busan, South Korea.

External links
  Cyber station information from Busan Transportation Corporation

Busan Metro stations
Suyeong District
Railway stations opened in 2002
2002 establishments in South Korea